For the Football trophy which was a predecessor to the Charity Shield, see Sheriff of London Charity Shield

The London Shield is the premier trophy at Under 17 level in the sport of shinty.  It takes its name from its having been donated by London Camanachd in 1989 to serve as a trophy in the national juvenile play-off. The 2012 winners were Kinlochshiel.

The current holders are Kingussie who claimed the 2017 Shield with a penalty shoot-out win after a thrilling 4–4 draw with Oban Camanachd.

Format
The format of the London Shield has changed over the years but at present consists of two leagues, one representing the South District, Badenoch and Fort William and the other the remainder of the North District.  This has seen several all-North finals in the last few years as the top two from each league enter the semi finals.  The final is usually played at a neutral venue.

List of Winners

References

External links
2012 Semis

Shinty competitions
Shinty